Simon David Fitzgerald (born 6 December 1966) is a former English cricketer.  Fitzgerald was a left-handed batsman who played primarily as a wicketkeeper.  He was born in Ilford, London.

Fitzgerald represented the Essex Cricket Board in List A cricket.  His debut List A match came against Ireland in the 1999 NatWest Trophy.  From 1999 to 2001, he represented the Board in 4 List A matches, the last of which came against Suffolk in the 2001 Cheltenham & Gloucester Trophy.  In his 4 List A matches, he scored 40 runs at a batting average of 10.00, with a high score of 19.  Behind the stumps he took 2 catches and made a single stumping.

References

External links
Simon Fitzgerald at Cricinfo
Simon Fitzgerald at CricketArchive

1966 births
Living people
People from Ilford
Cricketers from Greater London
English cricketers
Essex Cricket Board cricketers
Wicket-keepers